Forsanvatnet or Forsvatnet is a lake that lies on the border of the municipalities of Steigen and Hamarøy in Nordland county, Norway.  The  lake lies just south of the Steigen Tunnel in the northeast part of Steigen.

See also
List of lakes in Norway

References

Steigen
Hamarøy
Lakes of Nordland